The Four Seasons Private Residences Bangkok is a 73-floor tower in the Sathon District in Bangkok, Thailand. The tower has a total structural height of 299.5 m (983 ft) and 355 residential units.

History 

The building was proposed in 2012 and construction began in 2015 and concluded in 2019. It is the 4th tallest building in Bangkok and Thailand, the 13th tallest building in Southeast Asia, and the 23rd tallest residential building in the world.

It has a waterfront view of Chao Phraya River and stands out among other residential buildings for how tall it is. The architectural style is modern and it has a unique shape. The tower is owned by Four Seasons Hotels and Resorts and is designed to be a permanent or temporary living space for people. The construction material used was mainly glass and concrete.

It is one of the newer buildings in Bangkok which is another reason why it is easily noticeable due to the facade.

The building is part of a residential boom in Bangkok as more tourists and citizens come to the city. It has been called "one of the last golden sites in Bangkok," due to the huge population and little room to build structures.

The project cost 32 billion baht, during completion focus was heavily on selling units as 70% of them were sold by September 2020 during the peak of the COVID-19 pandemic.

See also 

 List of tallest buildings in Bangkok
 List of tallest buildings in the Thailand
 List of tallest buildings in Southeast Asia
 List of tallest residential buildings

References

External links 

 Official website

Buildings and structures on the Chao Phraya River
Skyscrapers in Bangkok
Skyscrapers in Thailand
Sathon district
Residential skyscrapers in Thailand